Hannsgeorg Laubenthal (1911–1971) was a German stage actor, who also acted in film and television. In 1967 he was awarded the Hersfeld-Preis.

Selected filmography
 Signal in the Night (1937)
 The Leghorn Hat (1939)
 Heart of Stone (1950)
 Der Untertan (1951)
 Final Accord (1960)

References

Bibliography 
Fischer-Lichte, Erika. Tragedy's Endurance: Performances of Greek Tragedies and Cultural Identity in Germany Since 1800. Oxford University Press, 2017.

External links 
 

1911 births
1971 deaths
German male stage actors
German male film actors
Actors from Cologne